William Henry Press (born May 23, 1948) is an astrophysicist, theoretical physicist, computer scientist, and computational biologist.    He is a member of the U.S. National Academy of Sciences, the American Academy of Arts and Sciences, and the Council on Foreign Relations. Other honors include the 1981 Helen B. Warner Prize for Astronomy. Press has been a member of the JASON defense advisory group since 1977 and is a past chair.

From 2009 through 2016, Press served as vice-chair of President Obama's President's Council of Advisors on Science and Technology (PCAST). In 2012–2013, he served as the 165th President of the American Association for the Advancement of Science. In July, 2016, he became the elected Treasurer of the U.S. National Academy of Sciences, and a member of its Council and Governing Board.

The son of geophysicist Frank Press, Press attended public schools in Pasadena, California, graduating from Pasadena High School in 1965.  His undergraduate education was at Harvard, where he received an A.B. in physics in 1969.  He received his Ph.D. in theoretical physics, from Caltech, in 1973, a student of Kip Thorne.  Press was briefly an assistant professor at Caltech, then was an assistant professor at Princeton University (1974–1976) before returning to Harvard as a professor in 1976.  At the age of 28, he was the university's then-youngest tenured faculty member (a distinction earlier held by Alan Dershowitz and later by Lawrence Summers and—at age 26—Noam Elkies).

Press was for more than 20 years a professor of astronomy and physics at Harvard University, and a member of the Center for Astrophysics  Harvard & Smithsonian.  He was department chair in Astronomy in 1982–1985. In 1998, Press left Harvard to become deputy laboratory director at Los Alamos National Laboratory (LANL), serving under Directors John C. Browne and George Peter Nanos. He oversaw LANL's participation in the Joint Genome Institute and in the construction of the Spallation Neutron Source. Press moved to the University of Texas at Austin in 2007 and, changing his area of research, became the Warren J. and Viola M. Raymer Professor, jointly in the computer science and integrative biology departments.

In the field of general relativity, Press is best known for his work with Saul Teukolsky, establishing the dynamic stability of rotating black holes.  In astrophysics, Press is best known for his discovery, with Paul Schechter, of the Press–Schechter formalism, which predicts the distribution of masses of galaxies in the Universe; and for his work with Adam Riess and Robert Kirshner on the calibration of distant supernovas as "standard candles".  This latter work enabled the discovery of the accelerating universe by Riess, Brian Schmidt, and Saul Perlmutter, for which they received the 2011 Nobel Prize in Physics.  Notably, with the 2017 Nobel award to Kip Thorne, Press joined the list of hapless individuals whose student and doctoral advisor have both won Nobels, but they haven't, a list that comprises Alfred Sturtevant, Gilbert N. Lewis, J. Robert Oppenheimer, Edward Teller, Victor Weisskopf, Charles Lauritsen, E.B. Wilson, Richard A. Muller, Sam Treiman, Sidney Coleman and a few others.

With Freeman Dyson, Press discovered and named the zero-determinant strategies for the Prisoner's Dilemma and other games.

Press is a co-author of the successful Numerical Recipes series of books on scientific computing.

In 1989 he was elected a Fellow of the American Physical Society "in recognition of important theoretical contributions to relativistic astrophysics and to cosmology"

References

External links 
William H. Press's website at the University of Texas at Austin
Curriculum Vitae
Google Scholar Profile: William H. Press

American relativity theorists
1948 births
Living people
Fellows of the American Academy of Arts and Sciences
Members of the United States National Academy of Sciences
Members of JASON (advisory group)
Harvard University alumni
Los Alamos National Laboratory personnel
20th-century American physicists
21st-century American scientists
California Institute of Technology alumni
Pasadena High School (California) alumni
Fellows of the American Physical Society
American textbook writers